North Industrial Area is a suburb of Accra noted for its industrial and commercial activities.

Banks
Zenith Bank
UniBank
Access Bank
GT Bank
Universal Merchant Bank
UT Bank
Société Générale

See also
 Kaneshie

Populated places in the Greater Accra Region